Ru Baru Ishq Tha, is a Pakistani romantic TV serial, directed by Furqan Khan and written by Amber Azhar under production house of TNI Productions. It stars Danish Taimoor, Ushna Shah and Sanam Chaudhry. It began airing on 22 June 2018 on Geo Entertainment.

It marks the return of Sanam Chaudhry and Ali Abbas after their hit serial Ghar Titli Ka Par.The show was initially titled Aatish-e-Ishq. It marks the appearance of legendary actors Javed Shaikh and Ayub Khoso.

Cast

Ushna Shah as Salwa
Danish Taimoor as Almeer
Sanam Chaudhry as Ayaan
Ali Abbas as Wahaj
Javed Shaikh as Murad
Ayub Khoso as Iftikhar
Rubina Ashraf as Riffat Ara
Seemi Pasha as Aalia
Najia Baig as Uzma
Agha Talal as Fawad
Sana Humayun as Anusha
Imran Patel 
Awais Waseer as Sherdil
Fahima Awan as Hamna
Hamza Khan
Shazia Qaiser as Safia
Musarrat Khan

Reception
Serial was in the news before its release due to its cast and promotions. The first episode gained 3.8 Trp by leading the slot. It was appreciated on YouTube. Its first episode won half a million views within 2 days. The character of Sanam Chaudhry (Ayaan) was popular. The second episode attained more viewers and got 4.30 trp while the third got 4.8 trp. The 4th and 5th episodes got 2.9 and 3.8 trp respectively.

Songs 
Ru Baru Ishq Tha Official  Original Sound Track Is Sung By Nabeel Shaukat Ali And Music Of The Ru Baru Ishq Tha Is Composed By Waqar Ali  Watch and Listen Official Song On Youtube  And Read The Lyrics Of The Song On KaalDev Lyrics

References

Pakistani drama television series
Comedy-drama television series
Urdu-language television shows
2018 Pakistani television series debuts
Geo TV original programming